Amblyseius meridionalis is a species of mite in the family Phytoseiidae.

References

meridionalis
Articles created by Qbugbot
Animals described in 1914